Tarachodidae is a now obsolete family in the order Mantodea, of genera found in Africa and Asia.

Former subfamilies
The family previously consisted of two subfamilies of "bark mantises":

Caliridinae
These genera have now been moved to the new families: 
Haaniidae: Caliris
Leptomantellidae: Leptomantella

Tarachodinae
This subfamily has now been moved to the Eremiaphilidae.
These genera are now placed in the subfamily Iridinae:
Dysaules
Iris

See also
List of mantis genera and species

References

External links

 
Mantodea families
Taxa named by Anton Handlirsch
Obsolete arthropod taxa